Dnestrovskaya Pravda is a Russian-language newspaper from Tiraspol, the capital of Transnistria. It was founded by the Tiraspol City Council of popular deputies in 1941. This is the oldest periodical publication in the region. Its name means Dniester Truth; taking it title from the Dniester river which flows through the city.

Its editor is Tatyana Mikhailovna Rudenko (Cyrillic: Татьяна Михайловна Руденко).

References

External links 
 Dnestrovskaya Pravda website – Revised: August 23, 1998

Russian-language newspapers published in Moldova
Mass media in Transnistria
Mass media in Tiraspol
Publications established in 1941